Andrea Lowell (born January 17, 1983) is an American actress and model most recognizable from her Playboy magazine nude pictorials and on air work for a variety of Playboy TV programs.

Career
Lowell was the co-host of The Playboy Morning Show on Playboy Radio.

In 2006, Andrea appeared on VH1's The Surreal Life and then came back the following season as a cast member of The Surreal Life: Fame Games.

On November 20, 2015, at World Series of Fighting 25 Lowell was a guest ring card girl.

Personal life
Lowell attended the University of California, Irvine, where she pursued her Biology degree.

On December 29, 2009, Lowell married longtime boyfriend James Kim, who is of Korean descent, in Las Vegas.

Filmography

References

External links
 Biography at AskMen
 

1983 births
Living people
Actresses from Long Beach, California
21st-century American women